The head of state of Pakistan from independence until Pakistan became a republic in 1956 was the Pakistani monarch. For the Governor-Generals who represented them from 1947 to 1956, see Governor-General of Pakistan.

The President of Pakistan is the head of state of the Islamic Republic of Pakistan. According to the Constitution of Pakistan, the president has "powers, subject to Supreme Court approval or veto, to dissolve the National Assembly, triggering new elections, and thereby dismissing the prime minister". These powers were repeatedly modified through amendments to the constitution, which were introduced as the results of military coups and changes in government. Since the 18th Amendment to the Constitution was passed in 2010, Pakistan has been shifted back from semi-presidential to a parliamentary republic. Under that system, the president has limited ruling powers, and performs ceremonial duties while the Prime Minister enjoys more powers to execute decisions. The president is chosen by the Electoral College composed of the Senate, the National Assembly and the Provincial Assemblies.

There have been thirteen presidents of Pakistan since the introduction of the post in 1956. The office was established when Pakistan was declared as a republic with the adoption of the 1956 constitution, and Iskander Mirza became the first president of the country. Until 1956, Pakistan was a dominion within the Commonwealth of Nations with Elizabeth II as the queen of Pakistan. Apart from these twelve, two acting presidents have also been in office for short periods of time. One of them, Wasim Sajjad, served as acting president on two non-consecutive occasions during 1993 and 1997–98. The president may remain in office for a tenure of five years. In the case where a president's term of office is terminated early or during the absence of the president, the Chairman of the Senate assumes office.

Six presidents have been members of a political party and four of them were active party members of the Pakistan Peoples Party (PPP). The first president was a retired military officer, four others were incumbent military officers of which three gained power through successful military coups in Pakistan's history – Ayub Khan in 1958, Muhammad Zia-ul-Haq in 1977 and Pervez Musharraf in 1999. President Zia died in office when his aircraft crashed while returning from Bahawalpur to Islamabad on 17 August 1988. Ayub Khan, during his two terms, remained in the office for the longest period with ten years and five months approximately.

The current president of Pakistan is Arif Alvi of Pakistan Tehreek e Insaf.

Line of succession and removal

The Constitution discusses the possibility of an acting president. in Chapter 1: The President,  Part III: The Federation of Pakistan in the Constitution of Pakistan.  Certain office-holders, however, are permitted to stand as presidential candidates in case of vacancy as the constitution does not include a position of vice president:
 The Chairman of the Senate of Pakistan
 The Speaker of the National Assembly of Pakistan. in Chapter 1: The President,  Part III: The Federation of Pakistan in the Constitution of Pakistan.

Monarchy of Pakistan

Under the Indian Independence Act 1947, British India was to be divided into the independent sovereign states of India and Pakistan. From 1947 to 1952, George VI was the sovereign of Pakistan, which shared the same person as its sovereign with the United Kingdom and the other Dominions in the British Commonwealth of Nations.

Following George VI's death on 6 February 1952, his daughter Princess Elizabeth, who was in Kenya at that time, became the new monarch of Pakistan. During the Queen's coronation in 1953, Elizabeth II was crowned as Queen of seven independent Commonwealth countries, including Pakistan. In her Coronation Oath, the new Queen promised "to govern the Peoples of ... Pakistan ... according to their respective laws and customs". The Standard of Pakistan at the Coronation was borne by Mirza Abol Hassan Ispahani.

Pakistan abolished the monarchy on the adoption of a republican constitution on 23 March 1956. However, Pakistan became a republic within the Commonwealth of Nations. The Queen sent a message to Pakistanis which said, "I have followed with close interest the progress of your country since its establishment ... It is a source of great satisfaction to me to know that your country intends to remain the Commonwealth. I am confident that Pakistan and other countries of the Commonwealth will continue to thrive and to benefit from their mutual association".

The Queen visited Pakistan as Head of the Commonwealth in 1961 and 1997, accompanied by Prince Philip, Duke of Edinburgh.

Key

President of Pakistan

Timeline

See also
 Governor-General of Pakistan
 Vice President of Pakistan
 List international trips made by the President of Pakistan
 List of prime ministers of Pakistan
 Military coups in Pakistan 
History of Pakistan
Politics of Pakistan
Political history of Pakistan
Constitution of Pakistan of 1956
Constitution of Pakistan of 1962
List of heads of state of Pakistan

Notes

References

External links

Pakistan
Presidents
List

ast:Presidente de Paquistán
bn:পাকিস্তানের রাষ্ট্রপতি
ca:President del Pakistan
cs:Prezident Pákistánu
dv:ޕާކިސްތާނުގެ ރައީސް
fr:Présidents du Pakistan
gl:Presidente de Paquistán
id:Daftar Presiden Pakistan
ja:パキスタンの大統領
pnb:صدر پاکستان
pl:Prezydenci Pakistanu
vi:Tổng thống Pakistan
zh:巴基斯坦总统